{{Infobox locomotive
| name=VR Class Dr13
| powertype=Diesel locomotive
| image = VR Dr13 2349.JPG
| caption = VR Class Dr13 museum locomotive (no. 2349) at Finnish Railway Museum, Hyvinkää 
| builddate=1962–1965
| builder= Alstom, Lokomo, Valmet
| totalproduction = 54
| serialnumber     = 2301–2354
| nicknames        = “Alsti”, “Alstikka”, “Alspommi”, “Myymäläauto” (“Mobile shop)
| uicclass= C'C'
| aarwheels = C-C
| gauge = 
| wheeldiameter=
| wheelbase= 
| length=
| width=
| height=
| axleload=
| locoweight=
| fueltype         = Diesel
| fuelcap          = 
| primemover       = 2 × MGO V16 BSHR
| enginetype = V16 diesel engine
| cylindercount = 16
| transmission=Diesel electric
| maxspeed= 
| poweroutput=
| operator=VR
| firstrundate=24 October 1962
| withdrawndate = June 2000
| disposition= 2 preserved, no. 2349 at the Finnish Railway Museum, others scrapped
}}

VR Class Dr13 (before 1 January 1976 called Hr13'') was a heavy diesel locomotive used by VR Group. The Dr13 was designed by the French company Alstom. The class consisted of 54 locomotives, of which the first two were built by Alstom’s factory in Belfort, France and were shipped to Finland in 1962, while the rest were built in Tampere at the factories of  Lokomo (odd numbers) and Valmet (even numbers). The first Dr13 series locomotive came to Finland on 24 October 1962. The Dr13 series was introduced between 1962–1963, and the last units were withdrawn by June 2000.

Design 
The Dr13 has been the most powerful and the fastest diesel locomotive in VR Group service. It was purchased to complement the VR Class Dr12 locomotives: Dr12 had a heavier axle load and less power. The Dr12 was therefore restricted to use on lines that have been laid for heavier axle loads. Dr13 had a similar engine to the medium-weight Dv12, the Tampella manufactured MGO V16 BSHR / BHSR, but the Dr13 had two of them, each driving its own generator. The 2 locomotives produced in France used engines manufactured by SACM. Dr13 fleet was initially operated in Eastern Finland on freight and passenger rail services, and stationed in Kouvola. As the electrified rail network in Eastern Finland expanded, Dr13 equipment began to be used in Western Finland on unelectrified sections of track.

Instead of the conventional electric motor arrangement, one motor per axle, the locomotive had a somewhat unconventional motor arrangement: two large electric motors, one for each bogie, placed on top of the bogies driving the three axles via an external gearbox. 
The class initially had a lot of teething problems affecting the battery, radiator and power train. The original French design could not withstand the severe Finnish climate. For instance, hoods had to be fitted in Finland to the air intakes and ventilation grilles on the roof to prevent snow from entering the engines. The locomotive weight was much higher than specified and the driving characteristics were not particularly good. Accordingly, careless driving could result in a bumpy ride on poor sections of track (hence the nickname of "Hyppyheikki" or "Jumping Heikki"). Not all the problems were solved, but this did not detract from the usefulness of the class in trains that needed a lot of power.
The last use of the class was pulling trains on the unelectrified line between Tampere and Turku. When the last Dr13s were withdrawn in June 2000, the class had completed almost 40 years service, and the youngest locomotives were 35 years old. Two locomotives of the class were preserved: No. 2349 for the Finnish Railway Museum and No. 2343.

Nicknames 
There were several nicknames for the Dr13 including “Alstom" and several based on Alstom: "Alstikka", "Alsti", "Alspommi" and "Ranskatar”(=Frenchwoman). Also, nicknames "Hyppyheikki" (= "Jumping Heikki"), "Kymen Huru", "Marinella", “Myymäläauto” (="Mobile shop") and "Nakkiputka" (=Sausage kiosk) were used. The last two referred to the characteristic looks of the windscreens. When ready for delivery into Finland in Belfort, France, Dr13 No. 2302 was named “Wäinämöinen” by the wife of the President of Finland Mrs Sylvi Kekkonen.

Numbering

Gallery

See also
 Finnish Railway Museum
 VR Group
 List of Finnish locomotives
 List of railway museums Worldwide
 Heritage railways
 List of heritage railways
 Restored trains
 Jokioinen Museum Railway
 History of rail transport in Finland

References

External links 

 Finnish Railway Museum
 Steam Locomotives in Finland Including the Finnish Railway Museum

Dr13
Dr13
Railway locomotives introduced in 1962
5 ft gauge locomotives
Alstom locomotives
Dr13